149 may refer to:

149 (number), a natural number
AD 149, a year in the 2nd century AD
149 BC, a year in the 2nd century BC
British Airways Flight 149, a flight from LHR to Kuwait City International Airport; the aircraft flying this flight was destroyed by Iraqi troops

See also
 List of highways numbered 149